John William Hill (10 February 1912 – 17 January 1984) was an Irish cricketer. A right-handed batsman and off spin bowler, he played fourteen times for the Ireland cricket team between 1946 and 1951, including seven first-class matches.

Playing career

He made his debut for Ireland against Scotland in July 1946 in a first-class match. His second game was also against Scotland in May 1947. The year continued with a match against Yorkshire during which he took 3/16 in the Yorkshire first innings, his best first-class bowling figures. This was followed by a match against the Craven Gentlemen and a three match series against South Africa before a match against the MCC at Lord's during which he made his highest score (27 not out) and took his best bowling (5/67) for Ireland.

He played against the MCC, Scotland and Yorkshire in 1948 and against Nottinghamshire and Scotland in 1950 before his final game for Ireland against Scotland in June 1951.

Statistics

In all matches for Ireland, he scored 138 runs at an average of 11.50. He took 32 wickets at an average of 22.16, taking five wickets in an innings once.

References

1912 births
1984 deaths
Irish cricketers
People from Coleraine, County Londonderry
Sportspeople from County Londonderry